Bazzaro is an Italian surname. Notable people with the surname include:

Ernesto Bazzaro (1859–1937), Italian sculptor, brother of Leonardo
Leonardo Bazzaro (1853–1937), Italian painter

Italian-language surnames